Noël Vandernotte (25 December 1923 – 18 June 2020) was a French rowing coxswain who competed in the 1936 Summer Olympics. He was the son of Fernand Vandernotte and the nephew of Marcel Vandernotte. In 1936 he won the bronze medal of the French boat in the coxed pairs event as well as in the coxed four competition. He was the youngest male medalist at the 1936 Games, at 12 years and 233 days, and is also the youngest French Olympic medalist of all-time.

References

External links
 
 
 

1923 births
2020 deaths
French male rowers
Coxswains (rowing)
Olympic rowers of France
Rowers at the 1936 Summer Olympics
Olympic bronze medalists for France
Olympic medalists in rowing
Officers of the Ordre national du Mérite
Medalists at the 1936 Summer Olympics
European Rowing Championships medalists
20th-century French people